The Chinese mackerel (Scomberomorus sinensis), also known as the Chinese seerfish, is a ray-finned bony fish in the family Scombridae, better known as the mackerel family. More specifically, this fish is a member of the tribe Scomberomorini, the Spanish mackerels. It is a marine species occurring in the Western Pacific Ocean, but it also enters the Mekong River.

References

Chinese mackerel
Fish of China
Fish of the Mekong Basin
Marine fauna of East Asia
Taxa named by Bernard Germain de Lacépède
Chinese mackerel